The Pekin Daily Times is an American daily newspaper published in Pekin, Illinois. It is owned by Gannett.

The Daily Times was founded as a daily in January 1881. A related weekly newspaper, The Pekin Weekly Times, had begun in 1873.

References

External links 
 

Gannett publications
Newspapers published in Illinois
Pekin, Illinois
Tazewell County, Illinois
Publications established in 1881
1881 establishments in Illinois